In mathematics, in the theory of integrable systems, a Lax pair is a pair of time-dependent matrices or operators that satisfy a corresponding differential equation, called the Lax equation. Lax pairs were introduced by Peter Lax to discuss solitons in continuous media. The inverse scattering transform makes use of the Lax equations to solve such systems.

Definition
A Lax pair is a pair of matrices or operators  dependent on time and acting on a fixed Hilbert space, and satisfying Lax's equation:

where  is the commutator.

Isospectral property
It can then be shown that the eigenvalues and more generally the spectrum of L are independent of t. The matrices/operators L are said to be  isospectral as  varies.

The core observation is that the matrices  are all similar by virtue of

where  is the solution of the Cauchy problem

where I denotes the identity matrix. Note that if P(t) is skew-adjoint, U(t,s) will be unitary.

In other words, to solve the eigenvalue problem Lψ = λψ at time t, it is possible to solve the same problem at time 0 where L is generally known better, and to propagate the solution with the following formulas:
 (no change in spectrum)

Link with the inverse scattering method 
The above property is the basis for the inverse scattering method. In this method, L and P act on a functional space (thus ψ = ψ(t,x)), and depend on an unknown function u(t,x) which is to be determined. It is generally assumed that u(0,x) is known, and that P does not depend on u in the scattering region where .
The method then takes the following form:
 In the scattering region where  is known, propagate  in time by using  with initial condition ,

Zero-curvature representation 
Any PDE which admits a Lax pair representation also admits a zero-curvature representation. In fact, the zero-curvature representation is more general and for other integrable PDEs, such as the sine-Gordon equation, the Lax pair refers to matrices that satisfy the zero-curvature equation rather than the Lax equation. Furthermore, the zero-curvature representation makes the link between integrable systems and geometry manifest, culminating in Ward's programme to formulate known integrable systems as solutions to the anti-self dual Yang–Mills (ASDYM) equations.

Zero-curvature equation 
The zero-curvature equations are described by a pair of matrix-valued functions , where the subscripts denote coordinate indices rather than derivatives. Often the  dependence is through a single scalar function  and its derivatives. The zero-curvature equation is then

This differs from the conventional expression by some minus signs, which are ultimately unimportant.

Lax pair to zero-curvature 

For an eigensolution to the Lax operator , one has

The Lax pair  can be used to define the connection components . When a PDE admits a zero-curvature representation but not a Lax equation representation, the connection components  are referred to as the Lax pair, and the connection as a Lax connection.

Examples

Korteweg–de Vries equation 
The Korteweg–de Vries equation 

can be reformulated as the Lax equation

with
 (a Sturm–Liouville operator)

where all derivatives act on all objects to the right. This accounts for the infinite number of first integrals of the KdV equation.

Kovalevskaya top 
The previous example used an infinite dimensional Hilbert space. Examples are also possible with finite dimensional Hilbert spaces. These include Kovalevskaya top and the generalization to include an electric Field .

Heisenberg picture 

In the Heisenberg picture of quantum mechanics, an observable  without explicit time  dependence satisfies

with  the Hamiltonian and  the reduced Planck constant. Aside from a factor, observables (without explicit time dependence) in this picture can thus be seen to form Lax pairs together with the Hamiltonian. The Schrödinger picture is then interpreted as the alternative expression in terms of isospectral evolution of these observables.

Further examples
Further examples of systems of equations that can be formulated as a Lax pair include:

 Benjamin–Ono equation
 One-dimensional cubic non-linear Schrödinger equation
 Davey–Stewartson system
 Integrable systems with contact Lax pairs
 Kadomtsev–Petviashvili equation
 Korteweg–de Vries equation
 KdV hierarchy
 Marchenko equation
 Modified Korteweg–de Vries equation
 Sine-Gordon equation
 Toda lattice
 Lagrange, Euler, and Kovalevskaya tops
 Belinski–Zakharov transform, in general relativity.

The last is remarkable, as it implies that both the Schwarzschild metric and the Kerr metric can be understood as solitons.

References 

  archive
 P. Lax and R.S. Phillips, Scattering Theory for Automorphic Functions, (1976) Princeton University Press.

Differential equations
Automorphic forms
Spectral theory
Exactly solvable models